Mathilukal is a 1990 Indian Malayalam-language film written, directed and produced by Adoor Gopalakrishnan based on the autobiographical novel of the same name by Vaikom Muhammad Basheer. The film focuses on the prison life of Vaikom Muhammad Basheer and the love between him and Narayani, a female inmate of the prison, who remains unseen throughout the film. Mammootty plays the role of Vaikom Muhammad Basheer while K. P. A. C. Lalitha gives voice to Narayani. The film was screened at the Venice Film Festival.

On the centenary of Indian cinema in April 2013, Forbes included Mammootty's performance in the film on its list, "25 Greatest Acting Performances of Indian Cinema".

Plot
Vaikom Muhammed Basheer is imprisoned on charges of sedition.  He is unlike the other prisoners, very inquisitive and armed with sardonic wit. Everyone takes a liking to him and even turns to him in times of distress. He strikes up a friendship with the Warden(Thilakan) and an enthusiastic jailor (Sreenath). Due to his unique charisma and popularity as an author, he is afforded privileges the other prisoners don't have. His written works are greatly appreciated by the policemen, who supply him papers to finish his work. One day, Basheer is informed that he will be released soon as all political prisoners are pardoned. But unexpectedly, Basheer's name was missing from the list. His enthusiasm and happiness takes a hit and he becomes filled with uneasiness and worry.  Due to the eerie solitude of the prison complex, Basheer starts to get depressed, but the other inmates try to encourage him to accompany them in making a vegetable garden in front of the neighbouring women's prison compound.

Bashir falls in love with a woman in the neighbouring prison compound. They are separated by a high wall, thus they never see each other and have to devise ingenious ways for communicating. They exchange gifts with each other by throwing the packages up high so that it crosses the wall. Narayani, Bashir's love is presented as a female voice and never appears in person in the film. Their exchanges are raw, unhinged, and unfiltered. Narayani then comes up with a plan for a meeting and they decide to meet at the hospital a few days later. But before that, Basheer is released, unexpectedly. For once, he does not want the freedom he had craved for. Bashir is released and isn't able to convey it to Narayani. Bashir helplessly looks at the walls and leaves the jail in tears.

Cast
Mammootty as Vaikom Muhammad Basheer
Murali as Basheer's childhood friend
Ravi Vallathol as Razaq
Sreenath as Aniyan, the friendly and enthusiastic young jailor
Karamana Janardanan Nair as a prisoner
Thilakan as Warden
 M. R. Gopakumar as Prisoner
Azeez as Inspector
 Babu Namboothiri as a political prisoner
K. P. A. C. Lalitha as Narayani (She doesn't appear in the film, but she voiced the female lead)

Awards
The film has won the following awards since its release:

 1989 Venice Film Festival (Italy)
 FIPRESCI Prize - Adoor Gopalakrishnan
 UNICEF Award - Adoor Gopalakrishnan

 1989 National Film Awards (India)
 Best Director - Adoor Gopalakrishnan
 Best Actor - Mammootty also for Oru Vadakkan Veeragatha
 Best Audiography - N. Harikumar
 Best Regional Film (Malayalam)

 1990 Kerala State Film Awards (India)
 Best Story - Vaikom Muhammad Basheer

 1990 Amiens International Film Festival (France)
 OCIC Award - Adoor Gopalakrishnan

 2002 Aubervilliers International Children's Film Festival (France)
 Best Film
 Grand Prize for Best Director - Adoor Gopalakrishnan

References

External links

Adoor's interview on Mathilukal
"33 years of Mathilukal: Interview with Adoor Gopalakrishnan". Radio Suno. (in Malayalam). May 2022.

1989 films
1989 romantic drama films
Films directed by Adoor Gopalakrishnan
Films set in the 1940s
Films based on Indian novels
1980s Malayalam-language films
Indian biographical drama films
Films whose director won the Best Director National Film Award
Films featuring a Best Actor National Award-winning performance
Films scored by Vijaya Bhaskar
Films that won the Best Audiography National Film Award
Best Malayalam Feature Film National Film Award winners